The City of Palmerston is a local government area of the Northern Territory of Australia. It contains the suburbs of Darwin's satellite city, Palmerston, and is situated between the outer industrial areas of Darwin and the rural areas of Howard Springs.

The Palmerston City Council consists of the Mayor and seven aldermen. The city is not divided into wards, thus each alderman represents constituents from the entire city. Council elections are held in August every four years. The next election is in 2021.

History
The City of Palmerston was incorporated in 1981 under the Local Government Act (NT), and in 2000 was proclaimed the Northern Territory's second city.

Suburbs

Suburbs of the inner city and of the outskirts, with post codes in parenthesis:

Sister cities
 Kupang, West Timor

Communications between the City of Palmerston and Kupang ceased in 2009 and a letter from previous Mayor, Robert Macleod was sent to the Mayor of Kupang advising him that Council had decided not to enter into a new agreement with the City of Kupang.

References

External links
Palmerston City Council website
map with suburb boundaries

Palmerston
Palmerston, Northern Territory
Darwin, Northern Territory